Trianon may refer to:

Places 
 Le Grand Trianon, a palace near Versailles, France
 Le Petit Trianon, a château near Versailles, France
 Le Trianon (theatre), a theatre and concert hall at 80, boulevard de Rochechouart in Paris
 Parque Trianon, a park in São Paulo, Brazil
 Petit Trianon, building housing the Academia Brasileira de Letras in Rio de Janeiro
 Trianon (Frankfurt am Main), a skyscraper in Germany
 The Trianon, formerly "Claremont", 1907 mansion now the main building of The Colorado Springs School
 Le Petit Trianon, a mansion on the grounds of De Anza College
 Trianon Ballrooms, ballrooms during America's big band era
 Trianon Historic District, a national historic district located at Kinston, North Carolina

Arts 
 Hotel Trianon, fictional hotel in Graham Greene's 1966 novel The Comedians
 "Trianon", the codename of the CIA spy in the 1984 Soviet film TASS Is Authorized to Declare...
 Live au Trianon, 2006 album by Camille Dalmais
 Trilogie au Trianon, alternate name for the 2001 Magma album, Theusz Hamtaahk

People 
 Catherine Trianon (1627–1681), French fortune teller and poisoner
 Henri Trianon (1811–1896), French critic, librettist and translator

Other uses 
 Treaty of Trianon, 1920 post-World War I treaty between Allies and Hungary, defining its borders
 Trianon model collection, a set of high-quality ship models ordered by Napoléon for documentary purposes
 Trianon, a trade name of sulfapyridine
 Trianon (sorority), a former American sorority 
 Simca Trianon, a model of the French auto, Simca Vedette
Trianon is also the name of the concentration camp in the book “It Can’t Happen Here” by Sinclair Lewis